NGC 304 is a lenticular galaxy in the constellation Andromeda. It was discovered on October 23, 1878, by Édouard Stephan.

One supernova, SN 2021dnn (mag. 15.3, type Ia), has been discovered in NGC 304 in February 2021.

References

External links
 

0304
00573
3326
18781003
Andromeda (constellation)
Discoveries by Édouard Stephan
Lenticular galaxies